William Fitz-Ansculf was a Norman-French landowner who succeeded his father, Ansculf de Picquigny.

Birth and early life

William's date of birth is not known, though it was likely in Picquigny, Picardy, now in the Somme department, France, in the mid 11th Century. William inherited many lands in central England that had been granted to his father, Ansculf de Picquigny by William the Conqueror after the Norman conquest in 1066. William made his base at the castle built by his father in Dudley, Worcestershire.   He and his successors were overlords of the manors of Selly Oak and Birmingham both of which had previously been owned by Wulfwin. His ownership of Selly Oak was challenged by the Bishop of Lichfield using a nuncupative (oral) will made by Wulfwin as evidence. It would appear that William Fitz-Ansculf died during the First Crusade. Henry of Huntingdon in his ‘History of the English People’ writes that: “Then from the middle of February they besieged the castle of ‘Arqah, for almost three months. Easter was celebrated there (10 April). But Anselm of Ribemont, a very brave knight, died there, struck by a stone, and William of Picardy, and many others.”.

Lands held
The Domesday Book of 1086 shows William holding from the Crown around one-hundred estates in twelve counties. Many of these were estates formerly held by King Harold Godwinsson, Lady Godiva, Earl Algar and Ulwin, a thegn based in the Midlands. William was either Lord, or tenant-in-chief.

List of land held by William Fitz Ansculf in 1086:

References

Anglo-Normans
11th-century births
11th-century deaths